Anil Jha Vats (born 24 August 1974) is a former MLA (Kirari Assembly) and an active leader of Bharatiya Janata Party and a former member of the Delhi Legislative Assembly. He was born in Madhubani district in Bihar in 1974. He did his schooling from S.B. Mills Sr. Sec. School, Shivaji Marg, Delhi. He did graduation and post-graduation from Satyawati College, Delhi University.  He started his political career being the Student Union President of Satyawati College.  He was elected as the president of Delhi University Students Union (DUSU) for 1997–98. He was elected to the Delhi assembly in 2008 and 2013 from  Kirari Constituency. He was also the Vice-President of BJP Delhi.

References

1974 births
Living people
Delhi MLAs 2013–2015
Presidents of Delhi University Students Union
People from Madhubani district
Bharatiya Janata Party politicians from Delhi